Woodroffe High School is a secondary school situated in the west end of Ottawa, Ontario. Woodroffe High School hosts an extensive variety of 20 school clubs, organizations and inter-school and intramural athletics. Woodroffe High School is a secondary school with a large athletic program, and a wide range of extra-curricular activities. A number of programs are being developed to better serve the students' interests. These include the development of a number of multi-disciplinary courses, an arts certificate, and an international studies certificate.

A variety of school clubs, organizations and inter-school and intramural athletics are offered under the direction and supervision of teacher and community volunteers.

The school is under the jurisdiction of the Ottawa-Carleton District School Board.

Location 

Woodroffe High School is located at the western end of the Sir John A. Macdonald Parkway, near the Lincoln Fields Shopping Centre and  Lincoln Fields Station.  A section of bike path connects the school to the Sir John A. Macdonald Parkway (Formerly called Ottawa River Parkway) running parallel to the Parkway. In turn, this path is interconnect with the network of bike paths stretching throughout the Ottawa Region that make up part of the greater Ontario Trails Council Trails network. A satellite location for Woodroffe High School has been proposed, but was never passed by the school board.

Programs
Woodroffe is noted for its French Immersion and Arts programs, which include drama and dance programs. These programs are frequently showcased in Woodroffe's Dance Showcases and annual musicals hosted in the school's auditorium. 
Woodroffe has a strong athletics program, winning many championships over the years in sports such as basketball, volleyball, rugby, soccer, and hockey.

School features 
 Campus featuring regulation sized gymnasium, smaller lower gymnasium, tennis courts, basketball court, sports track, Soccer Field, baseball diamond and two playing fields.
 Science labs rebuilt in 1995.
 Auditorium with theatrical fly gallery.
 French immersion and Spanish programs.
 Outdoor Pursuits and Outdoor education program.
 Computer Science and Technology programs.
 Athletic programs, intramurals and sports centric clubs.
 Partnerships with Pinecrest-Queensway Health and Community Services, and Algonquin College.
 Extensive Cooperative Education Program.
 Innovative Arts Certificate Program.
 Extensive ESL & ELD programs.
 Growing number of International Students coming to WHS, thanks to International exchange programs.

References

External links
School Website
OCDSB Website
2009-2010 OCDSB School Profile

High schools in Ottawa
Educational institutions established in 1960
1960 establishments in Ontario